William Henry Wilmarth (August 3, 1904 – January 25, 1999) was an American sound engineer. He was nominated for two Academy Awards for Best Special Effects.

Selected filmography
Wilmarth was nominated for two Academy Awards for Best Special Effects:

Nominated
 That Hamilton Woman (1941)
 Jungle Book (1942)

References

External links
 (misspelling)

1904 births
1999 deaths
American audio engineers
Film people from Milan
20th-century American engineers